The Nubian languages are a group of related languages spoken by the Nubians. In the past, Nubian languages were spoken throughout much of Sudan, but as a result of Arabization they are today mostly limited to the Nile Valley between Aswan (southern Egypt) and Al Dabbah. Nubian is not to be confused with the various Nuba languages spoken in villages in the Nuba mountains and Darfur.

More recent classifications, such as those in Glottolog, consider that Nubian languages form a primary language family. Older classifications consider Nubian to be branch of the Nilo-Saharan phylum, a proposal that has been losing support among linguists due to lack of supporting data.

History 

Old Nubian is preserved in at least a hundred pages of documents, comprising both texts of a Christian religious nature and documentary texts dealing with state and legal affairs. Old Nubian was written with a slanted uncial variety of the Coptic alphabet, with the addition of characters derived from Meroitic. These documents range in date from the 8th to the 15th century AD. Old Nubian is currently considered ancestral to modern Nobiin, even though it shows signs of extensive contact with Dongolawi. Another, as yet undeciphered Nubian language has been preserved in a few inscriptions found in Soba, the capital of Alodia. Since their publication by Adolf Ermann in 1881, they are referred as 'Alwan inscriptions' or 'Alwan Nubian.'

A reconstruction of Proto-Nubian has been proposed by Claude Rilly (2010: 272-273).

Present-day Languages

Rilly (2010) distinguishes the following Nubian languages, spoken by in total about 900,000 speakers:
 Nobiin, the largest Nubian language with 545,000 speakers in Egypt, Sudan, and the Nubian diaspora. Previously known by the geographic terms Mahas and Fadicca/Fiadicca. As late as 1863 this language, or a closely related dialect, was known to have been spoken by the arabized Nubian Shaigiya tribe.
 Kenzi (endonym: Mattokki) with 100,000 speakers in Egypt and Dongolawi (endonym: Andaandi) with 180,000 speakers in Sudan. They are no longer considered a single language, but closely related. The split between Kenzi and Dongolawi is dated relatively recently to the 14th century.
 Midob (Meidob) with 30,000 speakers. The language is spoken primarily in and around the Malha volcanic crater in North Darfur.
 Birgid, now extinct, was spoken north of Nyala around Menawashei, with the last known speakers alive in the 1970s. It was the predominant language between the corridor of Nyala and al-Fashir in the north and the Bahr al-Arab in the south as recently as 1860.  
 Hill Nubian or Kordofan Nubian, a group of closely related languages or dialects spoken in various villages in the northern Nuba Mountains; in particular by the Dilling, Debri, and Kadaru. An extinct language, Haraza, is known only from a few dozen words recalled by village elders in 1923.

Synchronic research on the Nubian languages began in the last decades of the nineteenth century, first focusing on the Nile Nubian languages Nobiin and Kenzi-Dongolawi. Several well-known Africanists have occupied themselves with Nubian, most notably Lepsius (1880), Reinisch (1879) and Meinhof (1918); other early Nubian scholars include Almkvist and Schäfer. Additionally, important comparative work on the Nubian languages has been carried out by Thelwall, Marianne Bechhaus-Gerst in the second half of the twentieth century and Claude Rilly and George Starostin in the twenty-first.

Classification 

Traditionally, the Nubian languages are divided into three branches: Northern (Nile), Western (Darfur), and Central. Ethnologue's classifies the Nubian languages as follows:.

 Northern (Nile)
 Old Nubian
 Nobiin
 Western (Darfur)
 Midob
 Central
 Kenzi
 Birgid
 Dongolawi
 Hill (Kordofan)
 Kadaru-Ghulfan
 Ghulfan
 Kadaru
 Unclassified
 Dair
 Dilling
 El Hugeirat
 Karko
 Wali

Glottolog groups all non-Northern Nubian branches in a single group named West-Central Nubian. Additionally, within Hill Nubian, Glottolog places Dair in the same branch as Kadaru.

The relation between Dongolawi and Nobiin remains a matter of debate within Nubian Studies. Ethnologue's classification is based on glotto-chronological research of Thelwall (1982) and Bechhaus-Gerst (1996), which considers Nobiin the earliest branching from Proto-Nubian. They attribute the current syntactical and phonological proximity between Nobiin and Dongolawi to extensive language contact. Arguing that there is no archeological evidence for a separate migration to the Nile of Dongolawi speakers, Rilly (2010) provides evidence that the difference in vocabulary between Nobiin and Dongolawi is mainly due to a pre-Nubian substrate underneath Nobiin, which he relates to the Meroitic. Approaching the inherited proto-Nubian vocabulary in all Nubian languages systematically through a comparative linguistic approach, Rilly arrives at the following classification:

 Nile Nubian
 Old Nubian
 Nobiin
 Kenzi-Dongolawi
 Dongolawi
 Kenzi
 Western Nubian
 Birgid
 Midob-Kordofan
 Midob
 Kordofan

Orthography
There are three currently active proposals for a Nubian alphabet: based on the Arabic script, the Latin script and the Old Nubian alphabet. In the publication of various books of proverbs, dictionaries, and textbooks since the 1950s, Latin has been used by four authors, Arabic by two authors, and Old Nubian by three authors. For Arabic, the extended ISESCO system may be used to indicate vowels and consonants not found in the Arabic alphabet itself.

See also

List of Proto-Nubian reconstructions (Wiktionary)

References

Sources

 Abdel-Hafiz, A. (1988). A Reference Grammar of Kunuz Nubian. PhD Thesis, SUNY, Buffalo, NY.
 Adams, W. Y. (1982). 'The coming of Nubian speakers to the Nile Valley', in The Archeological and Linguistic Reconstruction of African History. Edited by C. Ehret & M. Posnansky. Berkeley / Los Angeles, 11–38.
 Armbruster, Charles Hubert (1960). Dongolese Nubian: A Grammar. Cambridge: Cambridge University Press.
 Armbruster, Charles Hubert (1965). Dongolese Nubian: A Lexicon. Cambridge: Cambridge University Press.
 Asmaa M. I. Ahmed, "Suggestions for Writing Modern Nubian Languages", and Muhammad J. A. Hashim, "Competing Orthographies for Writing Nobiin Nubian", in Occasional Papers in the Study of Sudanese Languages No. 9, SIL/Sudan, Entebbe, 2004.
 Ayoub, A. (1968). The Verbal System in a Dialect of Nubian. Khartoum: University of Khartoum.
 Bechhaus-Gerst, Marianne (1989). 'Nile-Nubian Reconsidered', in Topics in Nilo-Saharan Linguistics. Edited by M. Lionel Bender. Hamburg: Heinrich Buske.
 
 Bechhaus-Gerst, Marianne (2011). The (Hi)story of Nobiin: 1000 Years of Language Change. Frankfurt am Main: Peter Lang.
 Erman, Adolf (1881). 'Die Aloa-Inschriften.' Zeitschrift für Ägyptische Sprache und Altertumskunde 19, no. 4." 112–15.
 Jakobi, Angelika & Tanja Kümmerle (1993). The Nubian Languages: An Annotated Bibliography. Cologne: Rüdiger Köppe Verlag.
 Khalil, Mokhtar (1996). Wörterbuch der nubischen Sprache. Warsaw: Nubica.
 Rilly, Claude (2010). Le méroïtique et sa famille linguistique. Leuven: Peeters.
   

 Starostin, George (2011). 'Explaining a Lexicostatistical Anomaly for Nubian Languages,' lecture, May 25, 2011. Online version.
 Thelwall, Robin (1982). 'Linguistic Aspects of Greater Nubian History', in The Archeological and Linguistic Reconstruction of African History. Edited by C. Ehret & M. Posnansky. Berkeley/Los Angeles, 39–56. Online version.
 Werner, Roland (1987). Grammatik des Nobiin (Nilnubisch). Hamburg: Helmut Buske.
 Werner, Roland (1993). Tìdn-Àal: A Study of Midoob (Darfur Nubian). Berlin: Dietrich Reimer.

External links
 Swadesh List comparing basic words of the Nubian languages
 Panafrican localization page on Nubian (summaries of information, links)
 Nubian alphabet examples 
The Lucky Bilingual: Ethnography of Factors Influencing Code-switching Among the Nubian Community in Southern Egypt
Music video by Sudanese women's group Al Balabil, featuring the Nubian song "The Boat Set Sail" ("بابور كسونا") with English translation
Music video featuring Nubian musician Hamza El Din's song Helalisa

 
Nubia
Language families
Languages of Egypt
Languages of Sudan
Northern Eastern Sudanic languages